F56 may refer to:

F56 (classification), a disability sport classification for disability athletics for people who compete in field events from a seated position
Farman F.56, a French pusher biplane reconnaissance aircraft
, a Leander-class frigate that served with the Royal Navy from 1967 to 1993
, a British Anchor Line passenger liner later converted into an armed merchant cruiser, pennant F56 during World War II
, a Canadian passenger and cargo ship, served as an armed merchant cruiser and later anti-aircraft cruiser in World War II
Wright GR-1820-F-56 Cyclone, an aircraft engine

See also